John W. Burgess may refer to:

 John Burgess (political scientist) (John William Burgess, 1844–1931), American political scientist
 John Wesley Burgess (1907–1990), Canadian member of Parliament